Nathaniel Alexander (15 August 1815 – 5 January 1853) was an Irish politician.

He was elected as Member of Parliament for County Antrim at a by-election on 14 April 1841, replacing John Bruce Richard O'Neill who had succeeded as Viscount O'Neill. He was re-elected at the general elections of 1841 and 1847 but left the House of Commons at the election in 1852.

He was the son of the Ven. Robert Alexander, Archdeacon of Down, by his wife Catherine Staples. His grandfathers were Nathaniel Alexander, Bishop of Meath, and John Staples, MP for Antrim. On 7 April 1842 he married Florinda, daughter of Richard Boyle Bagley and granddaughter of Richard Handcock, 2nd Baron Castlemaine; their sons succeeded to the family property at Portglenone (now a Trappist monastery).  He died in Islay, Scotland at the home of Belfast shipping owner, Robert Langtry.

References

 
 http://thepeerage.com/p25898.htm#i258974

External links 
 

1815 births
1853 deaths
Irish Conservative Party MPs
Nathaniel
Members of the Parliament of the United Kingdom for County Antrim constituencies (1801–1922)
UK MPs 1837–1841
UK MPs 1841–1847
UK MPs 1847–1852